The Levy Biche LB.2 was a single seat French sesquiplane fighter aircraft designed to be used from aircraft carriers. With a watertight fuselage, jettisonable wheeled undercarriage and small under-wing floats, it could survive emergency sea touchdowns; it could also be fitted with seaplane type floats.

Development
The LB.2 was designed as a shipboard fighter.  It was a single bay sesquiplane, with outward leaning parallel pairs of interplane struts and wire cross bracing.  The wings were strictly rectangular in plan, the lower plane smaller in both span and chord. The upper wing carried full span ailerons. Its flat sided fuselage was watertight and its belly deep; in emergency touchdowns at sea the undercarriage could be jettisoned with the aircraft stabilised with two small rectangular cross section, planing floats mounted on the lower wing underside below the interplane struts.

The LB 2 was powered by a  Hispano-Suiza 8Fe upright water-cooled V-8 engine. The upper wing was high above the fuselage on cabane struts and had a rounded cut-out in the trailing edge over the pilot's open cockpit to enhance his view. He had a short, faired headrest.  The fuselage tapered aft and had  distinct narrow keel to enhance its water surface behaviour.  The braced tailplane was wide chord and triangular in plan, carrying split elevators; the fin was also broad and triangular, with a deep, curved rudder that reached down to the bottom of the extreme keel, where there was a very small tailskid. The jettisonable main fixed conventional undercarriage structure had two short V-struts, supporting a wire cross braced single axle and mainwheels.  Armament consisted of a pair of 7.7 mm (0.303 in) Vickers machine guns.

The first flight was in 1927 and by October that year it had also flown with seaplane style floats. Soon after, Constructions Aéronautiques J Levy became bankrupt and production rights were purchased by Etablissements P. Levasseur.  The latter built twenty production aircraft during 1928-9, designated LB.2 AMBC.1, which served on the experimental French aircraft carrier Béarn, commissioned in May 1927, as well as from shore bases. The LB.2 remained in service with French Naval Aviation until 1932, when they were replaced by Wibault 74 fighters.

Variants
LB.2 Prototype.
LB.2 AMBC.1Production by Levasseur (20 built).

Units using this aircraft

Aéronautique Navale
Fighter units aboard the Béarn
Shore units.

Specifications

References

Sesquiplanes
1920s French fighter aircraft